Thomas Dunn (born 1954) is a male retired boxer who competed for England.

Boxing career
Dunn was the National Champion in 1973 after winning the prestigious ABA lightweight title, boxing out of the Reading ABC.

He represented England in the light-welterweight (-63.5 Kg) division, at the 1974 British Commonwealth Games in Christchurch, New Zealand.

He turned professional on 25 March 1974 and fought in 36 fights until 1979.

References

1954 births
English male boxers
Boxers at the 1974 British Commonwealth Games
Living people
Lightweight boxers
Light-welterweight boxers
Commonwealth Games competitors for England